V-class submarine may refer to:

 British V-class submarine (1914), a class of British submarines built during World War I
 British V-class submarine, officially "U-Class Long hull 1941–42 program," a class of British submarines built during World War II
 , a class of Dutch submarines built between 1916 and 1922